Zygmunt Ian Gordon (born 23 April 1993) is a Scottish professional footballer who plays as a fullback for Sydney Olympic.

Gordon has previously played in his native Scotland for Hamilton and Partick Thistle, and in Poland for Jagiellonia Białystok and Pogoń Siedlce. He represented Scotland twice at the under-19 international level.

Club career

Hamilton Academical
Gordon made his professional debut for Hamilton Academical on 1 February 2011, in a 0–2 defeat against St Johnstone in the Scottish Premier League. He signed a new two-year contract extension in April 2012.

Before the start of the 2012–13 season, Gordon stated his determination to become a first-team regular. In November 2012, Gordon stated that he believed the club's position in the league table was not merited by their recent performances, while in January 2013 he stated that recent results were not a reflection of recent performances. In February 2013 he stated that the club's upcoming "hectic" game schedule was not concerning. On 5 March 2013, in a league game against Morton, Gordon scored his first goal for the club. Gordon was awarded the 'Man of the Match' award for his performance in that game. Gordon later commented that he hoped his goal, and the victory, would spur the team onto a good run of form in the league. Gordon was named Hamilton's Player of the Year for the 2012–13 season.

Ahead of the 2013–14 season, Gordon talked about the importance of home advantage in the forthcoming campaign. He signed a new two-year contract extension in February 2014. In April 2014 he was selected to the 2013–14 Championship PFA Scotland Team of the Year, alongside Hamilton teammates Anthony Andreu and Ali Crawford.

In January 2015 the club rejected a transfer bid for Gordon from Polish club Jagiellonia Białystok. In May 2016 it was announced that Gordon would leave the club at the end of the season.

Partick Thistle
Gordon signed for Partick Thistle in July 2016.

Poland
Gordon signed Jagiellonia Białystok in January 2017. He left the Ekstraklasa club in January 2018 as his contract was mutually terminated. Gordon signed for Pogoń Siedlce in February 2018.

Return to Hamilton
Gordon returned to Hamilton Academical in June 2018, signing a one-year contract. He left the club following the expiry of his contract.

In May 2019 it was announced he would sign for Romanian club Dinamo București. However, in June 2019 the deal was cancelled.

Australia
Gordon joined A-League club Central Coast Mariners in June 2019. In November 2020, Gordon signed a one-year contract extension with the club. Despite this, a month later he departed the club.

In December 2020, after leaving Central Coast Mariners, Gordon joined Western Sydney Wanderers. He left the club in May 2022.

He joined Sydney Olympic for the 2023 season.

International career
He made his international debut for Scotland U19 in May 2011.

Personal life
Gordon is of Polish descent. His mother Barbara's family hail from Kraków, meaning he is also eligible to represent Poland at international level.

In May 2017 he criticised coaching standards in Scottish football, stating that Polish coaches were far advanced. His claims were dismissed by Scottish coaches Ian McCall and Tam McManus.

He was a national champion in chess as a child, choosing to concentrate on football after youth matches clashed with tournaments in the board game at weekends.

Career statistics

References

1993 births
Living people
Footballers from Glasgow
Scottish people of Polish descent
Scottish footballers
Scotland youth international footballers
Hamilton Academical F.C. players
Partick Thistle F.C. players
Jagiellonia Białystok players
MKP Pogoń Siedlce players
Scottish Premier League players
Scottish Football League players
Scottish Professional Football League players
Central Coast Mariners FC players
Western Sydney Wanderers FC players
Ekstraklasa players
I liga players
Association football fullbacks
Scottish expatriate footballers
Scottish expatriate sportspeople in Poland
Expatriate footballers in Poland
Scottish expatriate sportspeople in Australia
Expatriate soccer players in Australia
A-League Men players
Sydney Olympic FC players